The women's 52 kg judo competition at the 2012 Summer Paralympics was held on 30 August at ExCeL London.

Results

Repechage

* France's Sandrine Martinet, having injured her ankle during her semi-final, did not take part in her bronze medal final, enabling Brazil's Michele Ferreira to win bronze in a walkover.

References

External links
 

W52
Judo at the Summer Paralympics Women's Half Lightweight
Paralympics W52